The 2020 PDC World Darts Championship (known for sponsorship reasons as the 2020 William Hill World Darts Championship) was the 27th World Championship organised by the Professional Darts Corporation since it separated from the British Darts Organisation. The event took place at Alexandra Palace in London from 13 December 2019 to 1 January 2020.

Michael van Gerwen was the defending champion, after defeating Michael Smith 7–3 in the 2019 final.

Raymond van Barneveld announced his intention to retire from professional darts with this tournament, playing his planned last match in the first round against Darin Young. He subsequently reversed this decision after a year out.

Fallon Sherrock became the first female player to win a match at a PDC World Championship, beating Ted Evetts 3–2 in the first round. She then went on to beat Mensur Suljović 3–1 in the second round, before losing 2–4 to Chris Dobey.

Peter Wright won his first World Championship, beating Van Gerwen 7–3 in the final.

Format
All matches were played as single in, double out; requiring the players to score 501 points to win a leg, finishing on either a double or the bullseye. Matches were played to set format, with each set being the best of five legs (first to three). For all rounds except the first, the final set had to be won by two clear legs, unless the set score went to 5–5, in which case a deciding leg would be played with the players throwing for the bull to decide who threw first.

The matches got longer as the tournament progressed:
First round: Best of five sets (no tie-break)
Second round: Best of five sets
Third round: Best of seven sets
Fourth round: Best of seven sets
Quarter-finals: Best of nine sets
Semi-finals: Best of eleven sets
Finals: Best of thirteen sets

Prize money
The prize money for the tournament was £2,500,000 in total – the same as in the previous year. The winner's share was £500,000. A special prize of £100,000 was available to any player who hits two nine-dart finishes, a feat which has never previously been achieved at any World Championship.

Qualification

Qualifiers
The top 32 from the PDC Order of Merit began the competition in the second round. The 32 highest ranked players on the PDC Pro Tour Order of Merit (not already qualified) and 32 qualifiers from around the world, including two female players, began in the first round.

Order of MeritSecond round (seeded)
  Michael van Gerwen (runner-up)
  Rob Cross (second round)
  Gerwyn Price (semi-finals)
  Michael Smith (second round)
  Gary Anderson (fourth round)
  Daryl Gurney (third round)
  Peter Wright (champion)
  James Wade (third round)
  Ian White (second round)
  Dave Chisnall (third round)
  Mensur Suljović (second round)
  Nathan Aspinall (semi-finals)
  Adrian Lewis (fourth round)
  Simon Whitlock (fourth round)
  Joe Cullen (second round)
  Jonny Clayton (third round)
  Stephen Bunting (fourth round)
  Jermaine Wattimena (second round)
  Mervyn King (third round)
  Darren Webster (third round)
  Krzysztof Ratajski (third round)
  Chris Dobey (fourth round)
  Jeffrey de Zwaan (fourth round)
  Max Hopp (third round)
  Steve Beaton (fourth round)
  Keegan Brown (second round)
  Glen Durrant (quarter-finals)
  Steve West (second round)
  Dimitri Van den Bergh (quarter-finals)
  John Henderson (third round)
  Danny Noppert (third round)
  Ricky Evans (third round)

Pro Tour Order of MeritFirst round
  Jamie Hughes (first round)
  José de Sousa (first round)
  Vincent van der Voort (second round)
  Brendan Dolan (second round)
  Gabriel Clemens (first round)
  Justin Pipe (second round)
  William O'Connor (second round)
  Ron Meulenkamp (second round)
  Harry Ward (second round)
  Ross Smith (first round)
  Kyle Anderson (second round)
  Kim Huybrechts (fourth round)
  Ted Evetts (first round)
  Andy Boulton (first round)
  Ryan Joyce (first round)
  Raymond van Barneveld (first round)
  Luke Humphries (quarter-finals)
  Darius Labanauskas (quarter-finals)
  Ryan Searle (third round)
  Arron Monk (first round)
  Ritchie Edhouse (second round)
  Mark McGeeney (second round)
  Josh Payne (second round)
  Cristo Reyes (second round)
  James Richardson (second round)
  Jelle Klaasen (second round)
  James Wilson (first round)
  Luke Woodhouse (third round)
  Steve Lennon (first round)
  Rowby-John Rodriguez (first round)
  Ryan Meikle (first round)
  Mickey Mansell (first round)

International QualifiersFirst round
  Seigo Asada (third round)
  Danny Baggish (second round)
  Keane Barry (first round)
  Kevin Burness (first round)
  Matt Campbell (first round)
  Jan Dekker (second round)
  Matthew Edgar (first round)
  Damon Heta (second round)
  Lourence Ilagan (first round)
  (second round)
  Marko Kantele (first round)
  Robbie King (first round)
  Boris Koltsov (first round)
  Nitin Kumar (first round)
  Nico Kurz (third round)
  Zoran Lerchbacher (second round)
  Paul Lim (first round)
  Noel Malicdem (second round)
  Geert Nentjes (first round)
  Devon Petersen (first round)
  Diogo Portela (first round)
  Benjamin Pratnemer (first round)
  Madars Razma (first round)
  Ben Robb (first round)
  Callan Rydz (second round)
  Fallon Sherrock (third round)
  Mikuru Suzuki (first round)
  Ciarán Teehan (second round)
  Benito van de Pas (second round)
  Yuki Yamada (second round)
  Darin Young (second round)
  Xiaochen Zong (first round)

Background
Michael van Gerwen, the reigning champion from the 2019 championship, who also won the 2014 and 2017 championship, was top of the two-year PDC Order of Merit and number one seed going into the tournament, having won six of the ten premier singles events held since the previous championship. 2018 world champion and reigning World Matchplay and European champion Rob Cross took the second seeding. As well as Van Gerwen and Cross, two other previous PDC world champions qualified as seeds, two-time champions Gary Anderson (5th seed) and Adrian Lewis (13th seed). Three-time consecutive reigning BDO world darts champion Glen Durrant took the 27th seeding on his PDC debut. As well as Durrant, 17th seed Stephen Bunting and 25th seed Steve Beaton were also previous champions of the BDO World Darts Championship.

The top seeds below Van Gerwen and Cross were two-time Grand Slam of Darts winner Gerwyn Price, 2019 World Championship runner-up Michael Smith, Gary Anderson, 2018 Players Championship Finals winner Daryl Gurney and 2019 German Darts Masters champion Peter Wright. 2019 UK Open champion Nathan Aspinall was the 12th seed.

2019 Czech Darts Open champion Jamie Hughes, in his first year as a full PDC tour card holder, was the highest-ranked non-seed on the 2019 PDC Pro Tour Order of Merit. As well as Hughes, five other qualifiers from the Pro Tour made their PDC World Championship debuts; Harry Ward, Ritchie Edhouse, Mark McGeeney, Luke Woodhouse and Ryan Meikle.

2007 PDC world champion Raymond van Barneveld qualified via the Pro Tour in his final year before retirement. Both Van Barneveld and fellow Dutchman Jelle Klaasen were former champions of the BDO World Darts Championship who qualified via the Pro Tour. Other players to qualify through the Pro Tour included 2019 World Grand Prix semi-finalist Chris Dobey, 2019 PDC World Youth Champion Luke Humphries and the 2019 PDC World Cup of Darts finalists from Ireland, William O'Connor and Steve Lennon.

The final group of 32 qualifiers was determined by a series of international qualifiers and secondary tours. 2019 Brisbane Darts Masters champion Damon Heta, the first player to win a World Series of Darts event in their own country, topped the Dartplayers Australia rankings, while Keane Barry won the Tom Kirby Memorial Irish Matchplay to qualify, having already qualified to play in the Junior Darts Corporation World Championship final held during the tournament. Barry was the youngest player at the 2020 championships and the third youngest all-time.

Two qualifiers were held for female players. The UK & Ireland qualifier was won by Fallon Sherrock, the 2015 BDO Women's World Championship runner-up, while the Rest of the World Qualifier was won by Mikuru Suzuki, the reigning women's champion from the 2019 BDO World Darts Championship. The final three places went to the three winners of a tournament between unqualified Tour Card holders, the winners being Benito van de Pas, Kevin Burness and Matthew Edgar.

Fifteen international qualifiers made their debuts; Danny Baggish, Keane Barry, Matt Campbell, Damon Heta, José Justicia, Robbie King, Nico Kurz, Benjamin Pratnemer, Madars Razma, Ben Robb, Callan Rydz, Fallon Sherrock, Mikuru Suzuki, Ciarán Teehan & Yuki Yamada. Razma was the first Latvian ever to qualify for the PDC World Championship.

Summary

The top quarter of the draw saw number one seed & reigning champion Michael van Gerwen easily reach the quarter-final, recovering from losing the first set to Jelle Klaasen in the second round to win, before consecutive 4–0 victories over Ricky Evans and former BDO World Champion Stephen Bunting. Lithuanian Darius Labanauskas reached the quarter-final stage for the first time, knocking out seeds including world number 9 Ian White and former BDO Champion Steve Beaton. In the quarter-final, Van Gerwen triumphed over Labanauskas, 5–2, to qualify for the semi-final for the seventh time in eight championships.

In the second quarter, fourth seed & 2019 runner-up Michael Smith was eliminated in the second round following a 3–1 defeat to debutant Luke Woodhouse. Reigning UK Open champion Nathan Aspinall reached the quarter-final with wins over Krzysztof Ratajski and two-time World Champion Gary Anderson, while two-time World Youth Champion Dimitri Van den Bergh defeated Woodhouse and two-time World Champion Adrian Lewis to also reach the quarter-final. In that quarter-final, Aspinall won 5–3 to reach his second semi-final in two attempts at the World Championship.

In the third quarter, 2018 champion Rob Cross was an early exit, losing to Kim Huybrechts in the second round without winning a set. 2007 champion Raymond van Barneveld was another early faller, crashing out to American Darin Young 3–1 in the first round. Van Barneveld had planned to retire after this tournament, but after sitting out the 2020 season announced his intention to return for 2021. Reigning World Youth Champion Luke Humphries came through a sudden-death leg against Jermaine Wattimena in the second round before defeating Nico Kurz and Huybrechts to reach consecutive quarter-finals. 2014 runner-up Peter Wright survived a match dart at bullseye to win a sudden-death leg against Noel Malicdem in the second round, before beating Seigo Asada and Jeffrey de Zwaan to reach the quarter-finals, where he triumphed 5–3 over Humphries to reach the semi-final for the first time since the 2017 tournament.

In the fourth quarter, Fallon Sherrock defeated Ted Evetts in the first round, becoming the first female player to win a match at the World Championships, before following that win with a 3–1 victory over 11th seed Mensur Suljović in the second round. Sherrock's run, which PDC chairman Barry Hearn said could be the "dawn of a new era" for darts, was ended in the third round by Chris Dobey. Third seed Gerwyn Price beat John Henderson and Simon Whitlock to reach his first World Championship quarter-final, while three-time reigning BDO World Champion Glen Durrant joined him in the quarter-final on his PDC debut with wins over sixth seed Daryl Gurney and Dobey. In the quarter-final Price dominated Durrant, winning 5–1 to reach his first semi-final.

The first of the semi-finals, between Price and Wright, was a bad-tempered affair. Wright won the first set against the darts, tapping his opponent on the arm and making comments to him as they went off for the break. Price levelled the match after the second set and celebrated exuberantly. Each player won two of the next four sets before Wright won three sets in a row to win the match and reach the second world championship final of his career. There was no handshake between the two players after the match, and Price said on Twitter that he had thought Wright's actions after the first set were out of order; later apologizing for his remarks.

In the second semi-final, between Van Gerwen and Aspinall, the reigning champion took the first set against the darts, before Aspinall levelled in the second. Van Gerwen broke again in the third set only for Aspinall to win the fourth set in a decider. Aspinall missed a dart to win the fifth set and Van Gerwen took the lead again, before winning the sixth set 3–0 to take a two-set lead in the match. Aspinall won the seventh set, but Van Gerwen took the next two to secure his place in the final against Wright, a repeat of the 2014 PDC World Darts Championship final.

In the final, held on New Year's Day 2020, Wright held the first set with a 3–2 win after Van Gerwen missed bullseye for a set-winning 170 checkout. Wright then took a two-set lead with a 3–1 set win, before Van Gerwen broke back in the third set with a 3–0 win, and won the fourth by 3–2. Wright regained the lead in the fifth and then took a 3–0 win in the sixth set to go back to two legs clear. Again, Van Gerwen broke back with a 3–1 in the seventh; but Wright quickly regained the advantage, winning the eight set 3–2. Wright went one away from the win with a 3–2 win in the ninth set. In the tenth set, Wright won the first leg. Van Gerwen missed double-12 for a perfect nine-dart finish in the second leg, but took the leg regardless. Wright won the third leg to throw for the match; and took out double-10 to win the world championship for the first time.

Schedule

Draw
The draw took place on 25 November 2019 on Sky Sports News.

Finals

Top half

Section 1

Section 2

Bottom half

Section 3

Section 4

Final

Statistics

Top averages
This table shows the highest averages achieved by players throughout the tournament.

Representation
This table shows the number of players by country in the 2020 PDC World Championship. A total of 28 nationalities were represented, sharing the record of the 2019 edition.

Media coverage
As with every previous PDC World Darts Championship, Sky Sports provided live coverage to the UK and Ireland. Sky Sports Darts, a temporary channel, broadcast all the games, with certain days simulcast on Sky Sports Main Event. BDO Ladies player Laura Turner and PDC player Devon Petersen joined the commentary team, alongside former players Wayne Mardle, John Part, Mark Webster and Rod Harrington, and commentators Rod Studd, Stuart Pyke, Nigel Pearson and David Croft. Dave Clark served as lead presenter, with Laura Woods and David Croft also hosting sessions.

TalkSPORT held the national radio rights to the tournament, with the majority of their coverage to be held on talksport 2. The coverage was presented by Andy Goldstein & Ray Stubbs. Commentary was provided by Nigel Pearson, John Gwynne, Ian Danter, Chris Mason, Paul Nicholson and Chris Murphy.

International broadcasters included DAZN in the United States and RTL in the Netherlands.

References

World Championship
World Championship
2019 sports events in London
2020 sports events in London
2019 in British sport
2020 in British sport
International sports competitions in London
2020
Alexandra Palace
December 2019 sports events in the United Kingdom
January 2020 sports events in the United Kingdom